Dumitru Paraschivescu (18 April 1923  – 22 February 2006) was a Romanian racewalker. He competed at the 1952 Summer Olympics and the 1956 Summer Olympics.

References

External links
  

1923 births
2006 deaths
Athletes (track and field) at the 1952 Summer Olympics
Athletes (track and field) at the 1956 Summer Olympics
Romanian male racewalkers
Olympic athletes of Romania